Copper oxide is a compound from the two elements copper and oxygen.

Copper oxide may refer to:
 Copper(I) oxide (cuprous oxide, Cu2O)
 Copper(II) oxide (cupric oxide, CuO)
 Copper peroxide (CuO2)
 Copper(III) oxide (Cu2O3)
 Copper(IV) oxide (CuO2)

References

Copper compounds